The 1965 BC Lions finished in fourth place in the Western Conference with a 6–9–1 record and failed to defend their Grey Cup title as the team ended the season on a five-game losing streak and missed the playoffs. 

On October 24, the Lions set the record for the highest single game regular season attendance at Empire Stadium of 37,788 (this was the CFL record that stood for over a decade until 1976).

While Joe Kapp led the league in passing for the second consecutive season with 2961 yards passing and 219 completions, the other stars on the team were getting older, including star tailback Willie Fleming who had only had 595 yards rushing. Defensive end Dick Fouts was the lone Lion to make the CFL All-star team.

Regular season

Season standings
The team finished 4th in the Western Conference:

Season schedule
The team had 6 wins and 1 tie in 16 games played:

Offensive leaders

Awards and records

1965 CFL All-Stars
DE – Dick Fouts, CFL All-Star

References

BC Lions seasons
1965 Canadian Football League season by team
1965 in British Columbia